Brachinus cibolensis is a species of ground beetle in the family Carabidae. It is found in Central America and North America.

References

 Erwin, Terry L. (2011). A Treatise on the Western Hemisphere Caraboidea (Coleoptera): Their classification, distributions, and ways of life, volume III. Carabidae - Loxomeriformes, Melaeniformes, 412.
 Riley K, Browne R (2011). "Changes in ground beetle diversity and community composition in age structured forests (Coleoptera, Carabidae)". . ZooKeys 147: 601–621.

Further reading

 Arnett, R.H. Jr., and M. C. Thomas. (eds.). (21 December 2000) American Beetles, Volume I: Archostemata, Myxophaga, Adephaga, Polyphaga: Staphyliniformia. CRC Press LLC, Boca Raton, Florida. 
 
 Richard E. White. (1983). Peterson Field Guides: Beetles. Houghton Mifflin Company.

Brachininae
Beetles described in 1970